Kurt Rötzer (7 June 1921 – 20 May 1984) was an Austrian long-distance runner. He competed in the men's 5000 metres at the 1952 Summer Olympics.

References

1921 births
1984 deaths
Athletes (track and field) at the 1952 Summer Olympics
Austrian male long-distance runners
Olympic athletes of Austria
Place of birth missing